Adrián Alejandro Rojas Contreras (born May 23, 1977) is a former Chilean professional football player.

Career
He started his career in Palestino, remaining with that club for 5 seasons until 2001. In 2002, he joined Racing Club of the Primera División Argentina, but he had a bad stretch for that club and had to return to Palestino. After that he joined Cartaginés of Costa Rica in 2002.

After one successful season in Costa Rica, Rojas moved back his country, now on one of the great teams of Chile, Universidad de Chile. In his first season Rojas had a successful performance, leading the club in penalties in 2004. After 2 seasons he signed for O'Higgins, managed by Jorge Garcés.

In 2008 Rojas was signed by Everton. In his first season the club won the championship of the country's first division against Colo-Colo in a global of 3-2. In his third match he scored his first goal with the team against Rangers.

Honours

Club
Universidad de Chile
 Primera División de Chile (1): 2004 Apertura

Everton
 Primera División de Chile (1): 2008 Apertura

External links
  Soccerway profile
  BDFA profile
 Goal.com profile

1977 births
Living people
Footballers from Santiago
Chilean footballers
Chilean expatriate footballers
Chile international footballers
Association football defenders
Club Deportivo Palestino footballers
Racing Club de Avellaneda footballers
C.S. Cartaginés players
Universidad de Chile footballers
O'Higgins F.C. footballers
Everton de Viña del Mar footballers
Rangers de Talca footballers
Deportes La Serena footballers
Chilean Primera División players
Argentine Primera División players
Liga FPD players
Primera B de Chile players
Chilean expatriate sportspeople in Argentina
Chilean expatriate sportspeople in Costa Rica
Expatriate footballers in Argentina
Expatriate footballers in Costa Rica